Cromford is a civil parish in the Derbyshire Dales district of Derbyshire, England.  The parish contains 89 listed buildings that are recorded in the National Heritage List for England.  Of these, two are listed at Grade I, the highest of the three grades, seven are at Grade II*, the middle grade, and the others are at Grade II, the lowest grade.  The parish contains the village of Cromford and the surrounding area.  The parish is important because it was here that Richard Arkwright built the first water-powered mill, and created the "first industrial community of its type in the world".  The first workers' houses were built in North Street, and each has three storeys, the top floor being a workshop.  There are listed at Grade II*.  Many houses were built later for the workers by Arkwright and his successors, and these had two or three storeys, but no workshop, and each had a standard pattern of two bays, with the doorway in one bay, windows in the other bay, and services at the rear.  These are listed at Grade II.  Arkwright's original factory and the subsequent associated buildings are listed at Grade I.

The Cromford Canal opened in 1793, ending at Cromford Wharf, near the factory.  A number of buildings and structures associated with the canal are listed.  The other listed buildings include further houses, cottages and associated structures, farmhouses and farm buildings, a church, a road bridge over the River Derwent, a group of former almshouses, shops, a hotel and a public house, a water wheel, a school and a school house, a pump house, buildings at Cromford railway station, and two war memorials.


Key

Buildings

References

Citations

Sources

 

Lists of listed buildings in Derbyshire